Paul Aubriot (30 July 1873 - 16 February 1959) was a French politician.

Aubriot was born in Paris.  He originally joined the Revolutionary Socialist Workers' Party (POSR), which merged into the French Socialist Party (PSF) in 1902. The PSF in turn merged into the French Section of the Workers' International (SFIO) in 1905. Aubriot represented the SFIO in the Chamber of Deputies from 1910 to 1919 and the French Socialist Party (PSF) from 1919 to 1928.

References

1873 births
1959 deaths
Politicians from Paris
Revolutionary Socialist Workers' Party (France) politicians
French Socialist Party (1902) politicians
French Section of the Workers' International politicians
French Socialist Party (1919) politicians
Members of the 10th Chamber of Deputies of the French Third Republic
Members of the 11th Chamber of Deputies of the French Third Republic
Members of the 12th Chamber of Deputies of the French Third Republic
Members of the 13th Chamber of Deputies of the French Third Republic